The Buffalo River is a  left-tributary of the Mississippi River in western Wisconsin in the United States.

Course
From Osseo, the Buffalo flows westwardly into Buffalo County, past Strum, Eleva and Mondovi.

For the last  of the Buffalo's course, it is surrounded by marshland, before emptying into Rieck's Lake, a migratory stopover for thousands of tundra swans and other waterfowl.  Rieck's Lake empties out into a riverine lake, called Buffalo Slough, part of Pool 4 on the Mississippi River.

Variant names
The United States Board on Geographic Names settled on "Buffalo River" as the stream's official name in 1930, and settled on the North Fork's name in 1969.  According to the Geographic Names Information System, the Buffalo River has also been known as:
Beef River
Beef Slough
River of Wild Bulls
Riviere de Beeufs

See also
List of Wisconsin rivers

References

External links

 Columbia Gazetteer of North America entry
 DeLorme (1992).  Wisconsin Atlas & Gazetteer.  Freeport, Maine: DeLorme.  .
 
 

Rivers of Wisconsin
Tributaries of the Mississippi River
Rivers of Buffalo County, Wisconsin
Rivers of Trempealeau County, Wisconsin